The Payambar Azam Arena is an indoor arena in Amol, Iran.

Event
2007 WAFF Futsal Championship
Martial qualifiers Iran 2008-2009-2010-2011

See also 
Iran Sports Venue

References 
 IRAN LIGA - Arena

Volleyball venues in Iran
Sport in Amol
Buildings and structures in Mazandaran Province